The 1974 All-Ireland Senior B Hurling Championship was the first staging of the All-Ireland Senior B Hurling Championship, the Gaelic Athletic Association's secondary inter-county hurling tournament. The championship began on 12 May 1974 and ended on 23 June 1974.

On 23 June 1974, Kildare won the championship following a 1-26 to 3-13 defeat of Antrim in the All-Ireland final. This was their fourth All-Ireland title in hurling, following on from earlier successes in the intermediate and junior grades. The prize for the winners was a place in the All-Ireland Senior Hurling Championship.

Kildare's Johnny Walsh was the championship's top scorer with 0-20.

Teams

Format

First round: (4 matches) These are four matches between the eight native participating teams.  Four teams are eliminated at this stage.  Two winning teams automatically qualify for the semi-final stage.  Two other winning teams play off in a lone quarter-final.

Quarter-final: (1 match) This is a single match between two first round winners.  One team is eliminated at this stage while the winners advance to the semi-final.

Semi-finals: (2 matches) The two winners of the first round join the winners of the lone quarter-final and British representatives Hertfordshire to make up the semi-final pairings.  Two teams are eliminated at this stage while the winners advance to the final.

Final: (1 match) The winners of the two semi-finals contest this game.  One team is eliminated at this stage while the winners are allowed to participate in a preliminary round for the All-Ireland Senior Hurling Championship.

Results

All-Ireland Senior B Hurling Championship

Championship statistics

Scoring

Widest winning margin: 13 points
Kildare 3-18 : 2-8 Meath (All-Ireland quarter-final)
Most goals in a match: 9
Hertfordshire 4-13 : 5-15 Antrim (All-Ireland semi-final replay)
Most points in a match: 39
Kildare 1-26 : 3-13 Antrim (All-Ireland final)
Most goals by one team in a match: 5
Antrim 5-15 : 4-13 Hertfordshire (All-Ireland semi-final replay)
Most goals scored by a losing team: 4
Hertfordshire 4-13 : 5-15 Antrim (All-Ireland semi-final replay)
Most points scored by a losing team: 13
Hertfordshire 4-13 : 5-15 Antrim (All-Ireland semi-final replay)
Antrim 3-13 :  1-26 Kildare (All-Ireland final)

Overall
Most goals scored - Antrim (14)
Fewest goals scored - Wicklow, Kerry (0)
Most goals conceded - Antrim (9)
Most points scored - Kildare (58)
Fewest points scored - Wicklow (4)
Most points conceded - Antrim (52)

Top scorers

Season

Single game

Sources

 Donegan, Des, The Complete Handbook of Gaelic Games (DBA Publications Limited, 2005).

1974
B